This is list of players from Nepal who took part in the Olympics. The number of players in each Olympics is shown in graph below.

List 
 Denotes flag bearer

See also
List of flag bearers for Nepal at the Olympics
Nepal at the Olympics

References

Olympic athletes of Nepal
Olympians